Prizer's Mill Complex is a national historic district located in East Pikeland Township, Chester County, Pennsylvania. The district includes 5 contributing buildings, 1 contributing site, and 2 contributing structures. They include miller's houses dated to the 18th and 19th century, two barns, a cistern, a grist mill, millrace, and the remains of a 19th-century carriage house.

It was added to the National Register of Historic Places in 1978.

References

Grinding mills on the National Register of Historic Places in Pennsylvania
Historic districts in Chester County, Pennsylvania
Buildings and structures in Chester County, Pennsylvania
Grinding mills in Chester County, Pennsylvania
Historic districts on the National Register of Historic Places in Pennsylvania
National Register of Historic Places in Chester County, Pennsylvania